Pedro Miguel Braga Rebocho (born 23 January 1995) is a Portuguese professional footballer who plays as a left-back for Ekstraklasa club Lech Poznań.

Club career

Benfica
Born in Évora, Rebocho started his football career at local club Juventude Sport Clube in 2004. Three years later, he joined S.L. Benfica's youth system, playing for their under-19 team in the 2013–14 UEFA Youth League, where they were runners-up to FC Barcelona. Previously, on 16 November 2012, he had signed a professional contract until June 2015.

On 9 August 2014, Rebocho was called up for a Benfica B match against C.D. Trofense in the Segunda Liga, but he did not feature in the former's 3–2 home win. Two weeks later, he made his professional debut in a 4–0 home victory over Académico de Viseu FC.

Rebocho finished the 2015–16 season with three goals in 28 matches, helping his team narrowly avoid relegation.

Moreirense
On 4 July 2016, Rebocho joined Moreirense F.C. on a three-year deal. His first game in the Primeira Liga took place on 25 September, when he played the entire 1–0 home loss to Vitória de Guimarães.

Rebocho contributed four appearances in the side's victorious run in the Taça da Liga, including the final 1–0 defeat of S.C. Braga on 29 January 2017.

Guingamp
On 20 June 2017, Rebocho agreed to a three-year contract at French club En Avant Guingamp. He made his Ligue 1 debut on 5 August, starting in the 3–1 away win against FC Metz.

On 8 August 2019, Rebocho was loaned to Beşiktaş J.K. of the Turkish Süper Lig on a season-long loan with the option to make the move permanent. On 12 January 2021, in a similar loan, he joined F.C. Paços de Ferreira.

Lech Poznań
On 23 August 2021, Rebocho joined signed a two-year contract with Lech Poznań. He made his debut in the Polish Ekstraklasa on 17 September, scoring and assisting once in a 5–0 home rout of Wisła Kraków.

International career
Rebocho was part of the Portuguese squad for the 2014 UEFA European Under-19 Championship. He played all matches in the tournament held in Hungary, losing the final 1–0 to Germany.

On 11 October 2016, Rebocho won his first cap for the under-21s, in a 7–1 away demolition of Liechtenstein in the 2017 UEFA European Championship qualifiers. Selected for the finals in Poland by manager Rui Jorge, he appeared in the 4–2 group win against Macedonia as the tournament ended at that stage.

Career statistics

Club

Honours
Moreirense
Taça da Liga: 2016–17

Lech Poznań
Ekstraklasa: 2021–22

References

External links

1995 births
Living people
People from Évora
Sportspeople from Évora District
Portuguese footballers
Association football defenders
Primeira Liga players
Liga Portugal 2 players
S.L. Benfica B players
Moreirense F.C. players
F.C. Paços de Ferreira players
Ligue 1 players
Ligue 2 players
En Avant Guingamp players
Süper Lig players
Beşiktaş J.K. footballers
Ekstraklasa players
Lech Poznań players
Portugal youth international footballers
Portugal under-21 international footballers
Portuguese expatriate footballers
Expatriate footballers in France
Expatriate footballers in Turkey
Expatriate footballers in Poland
Portuguese expatriate sportspeople in France
Portuguese expatriate sportspeople in Turkey
Portuguese expatriate sportspeople in Poland